Maciej Makuszewski (born 29 September 1989 in Grajewo) is a Polish professional footballer who plays as a winger for I liga club Odra Opole.

Career

Club
Makuszewski started his career with UKS SMS Łódź.

In the summer of 2008, he joined Wigry Suwałki on a one-year deal.
In June 2010, he moved to Jagiellonia Białystok where he signed a four-year contract.

On 6 September 2012, Makuszewski signed a three-year contract with the Russian Russian Premier League team, Terek Grozny. In January 2014 he was loaned to Lechia Gdańsk for six months with an option to buy.

On 11 July 2016, he joined Lech Poznań on a one-year loan with an option to buy.
He joined Lech permanently on a three-yeal deal on 16 June 2017. He left the club by mutual consent on 12 February 2020.

On the same day, he returned to Jagiellonia, signing a contract until the end of the season with a one-year option.

International
He was a member of the Poland national under-21 football team. He made his debut in Poland national football team in the away game against Denmark on 1 September 2017.

In May 2018, he was named in Poland’s preliminary 35-man squad for the 2018 World Cup in Russia. However, he did not make the final 23.

Career statistics

Club

1 Including Polish Super Cup.

Honours

Club
Jagiellonia Białystok
 Polish Super Cup: 2010

Lech Poznań
 Polish Super Cup: 2016

References

External links

 
 

1989 births
Living people
People from Grajewo
Sportspeople from Podlaskie Voivodeship
Polish footballers
Wigry Suwałki players
Jagiellonia Białystok players
FC Akhmat Grozny players
Lechia Gdańsk players
Vitória F.C. players
Lech Poznań players
Leiknir Reykjavík players
Odra Opole players
Polish expatriate footballers
Polish expatriate sportspeople in Russia
Polish expatriate sportspeople in Portugal
Polish expatriate sportspeople in Iceland
Expatriate footballers in Russia
Expatriate footballers in Portugal
Expatriate footballers in Iceland
Ekstraklasa players
Russian Premier League players
Primeira Liga players
Úrvalsdeild karla (football) players
Association football midfielders
Poland under-21 international footballers
Poland international footballers